Phyllosticta alliariaefoliae is a fungal plant pathogen infecting bellflowers (Campanula carpatica).

References

External links
 USDA ARS Fungal Database

Fungal plant pathogens and diseases
Ornamental plant pathogens and diseases
alliariaefoliae